The Portland Fire were a professional basketball team in the Women's National Basketball Association (WNBA) based in Portland, Oregon that joined the league in 2000 as the counterpart to the NBA’s Portland Trail Blazers. They played their games at the Rose Garden. The team folded after the 2002 season, after just three seasons in the league. They were the only WNBA team that had never made the playoffs.

History
In its short, three-year history, the Portland Fire franchise held some of the more dubious distinctions among WNBA franchises.  Founded in 2000, Portland Trail Blazers owner Paul Allen served as the team's chairman.  Led by Vanessa Nygaard and Sylvia Crawley, the team managed a 10–22 win–loss record in their inaugural season. In the 2001 season, the team faced another losing season but found hope in the play of rookie guard Jackie Stiles, who would win the WNBA Rookie of the Year Award.  However, in 2002 Stiles suffered a severe injury and was out for most of the season. Without their star player, the Fire finished with an even record.

The 2002 season proved to be the Portland Fire's swan song season, but most improved. After this season, the WNBA sold ownership of their franchises to owners of their counterpart NBA teams or to third parties. Portland Fire chairman Paul Allen's continued financial problems with what was seen league-wide as an underachieving Trail Blazers team put him out of the running to buy the Fire franchise and led to the Portland Fire folding in 2002. A group led by Clyde Drexler and Terry Emmert attempted to buy the franchise, but a deal was not made. With this, the Fire became the only WNBA franchise not to make the playoffs, and along with the Miami Sol, the WNBA franchise with the shortest lifespan.

Season-by-season records

Roster and coach

Players
Tully Bevilaqua, who went on to play with the San Antonio Silver Stars
Monique Cardenas, retired after rookie season and the Fire's folding in 2002.
Sylvia Crawley, now as assistant coach for the North Carolina Tar Heels women's basketball team.
Kristin Folkl, retired after the Fire's folding in 2002.</ref>
Melody Johnson, retired after rookie season and the Fire's folding in 2002.
Vanessa Nygaard: Now head coach of the Phoenix Mercury.
Lynn Pride: Played for Portland in the inaugural expansion 2000 season before being traded to the Lynx, where she played for two and a half seasons (2001–03). She was waived by the Lynx before signing up with the Sparks, where she played the rest of the 2003 season before retiring.
Jackie Stiles: Selected fourth overall by the Portland Fire in the 2001 WNBA Draft, she was later voted the Rookie of the Year on August 16, 2001. But since that high point, Stiles has suffered numerous injuries, including 13 surgeries, which has greatly hampered her WNBA career (2001–03). After the Fire folded in 2002, Stiles was selected 14th by the Los Angeles Sparks to play for the Sparks in the 2003 season, but did not play due to spending rehabilitation time for her injuries. She retired from the WNBA after that season, though her WNBA rights are still owned by the last team she was with, the L.A. Sparks. After an injury-hampered WNBA career, in 2004, Stiles made her first comeback to basketball in a new league on a new basketball team and signed with the Lubbock Hawks (in Lubbock, Texas) of the National Women's Basketball League (NWBL), which proved unsuccessful for her. Stiles made her second comeback to basketball in a different league with a different team on September 29, 2006, when the Canberra Times reported that Stiles signed to play for the Canberra Capitals in the Women's National Basketball League in Australia.
Stacey Thomas: She was selected 23rd overall in the 2000 WNBA Draft by the Portland Fire. When she became a free agent after the Fire's folding following the 2002 season, she signed with Portland's I-5 rivals, the Seattle Storm, but was waived before she even played in a Storm uniform. She played for the Phoenix Mercury, the team that signed Thomas after the Storm let her go, the 2003 WNBA Championship Detroit Shock team, the Minnesota Lynx, and then the Charlotte Sting. After the 2006 Charlotte Sting season, Stacey Thomas decided to retire from the WNBA in 2006 because she thought it was time. Following her retirement, the Charlotte Sting folded on January 3, 2007, just a few months prior to the start of the next WNBA season.
Michele Van Gorp: An assistant coach at Colgate University since June 2007.
DeMya Walker: Signed a free agent contract with the Portland Fire in 2000 after being released by the Minnesota Lynx a few months back, and played with them for all three seasons of their existence. The WNBA held a Dispersal draft on April 24, 2003, which Walker was a part of, that involved various former players from the newly-defunct Portland Fire and Miami Sol franchises that were chosen by the existing WNBA teams. The Sacramento Monarchs selected Walker as the fifth overall pick in the 2003 WNBA Dispersal Draft. Walker played the next several seasons with the Monarchs (2003–08), and helped the team win the 2005 WNBA Finals by defeating the Connecticut Sun, three games to one. Walker was waived by the Monarchs on May 15, 2008. Walker was re-signed by the team on July 21, 2008, making her a free agent or another WNBA retiree who started their career with the dubious Portland Fire.
Sophia Witherspoon: Played a total of 7 seasons in the WNBA. Two of them with the Portland Fire (The first two seasons in franchise history; 2000 & 2001). Before that, she played with the New York Liberty from 1997-99. After her 2000–01 stint with the Fire, she played her last two seasons with the Los Angeles Sparks in 2002-03 before retiring.

Head coach
Linda Hargrove was the head coach and general manager of the Portland Fire from 2000 to 2002. She later served as general manager of the Washington Mystics from 2005 until 2008.

References

 
Basketball teams established in 2000
Basketball teams disestablished in 2002
Defunct Women's National Basketball Association teams
Defunct basketball teams in Oregon
Fire
2000 establishments in Oregon
2002 disestablishments in Oregon